The French men's national under 20 ice hockey team is the national under-20 ice hockey team in France. The team represents France at the International Ice Hockey Federation's IIHF World U20 Championship's World Junior Hockey Championship Division I.

History
France made their first and only appearance at the top level at the 2002 World Junior Championships, when the French team defeated the likes of Germany, Ukraine, Austria, Norway, Latvia, and Poland, all of whom would eventually or saw top division competition. France defeated Ukraine 2-1 to secure a spot among the 10 national junior teams competing at the 25th IIHF-sanctioned World Junior Hockey Championships held in Pardubice, Czech-Republic in 2001-02. France opened their first game against Canada and lost 15-0, which still stands as their largest margin of defeat. The French would never recover with losses to Russia (5-1), Finland (8-0), Switzerland (8-0). France would automatically be sent down to the relegation round with back-to-back games against Belarus. France won the first game 3-2, but would end up losing 4-2 the following game sending France packing back to Division I. 

France had a powerful start to the 2003 World Junior Division I championships held in Almaty, Kazakhstan as they won their first game 10-1 against Croatia, but losses to Japan (4-2), Kazakhstan (3-0), and Ukraine (3-0) cost France their chance to return to the top level. Ukraine would go on to win the tournament and return for the first time since 2000. 

Briancon, France was host to the 2004 World Junior Championships Division I. France won the opening game 4-1 over Japan, but would not recover as Belarus earned its second promotion to the top division. Since then, France has never been promoted out of Division I and nearly relegated to Division II. 

Phillipe Bozon, who is the only France-born player to suit up for the NHL's St. Louis Blues was named head coach of the U20 program in 2009. France hosted the 2010 Division I championships in Megeve & Saint-Gervais, France. With Bozon appointed as head coach to replace Dave Henderson, who led the squad to the top division for 2002. Many predicted France would easily be promoted to top division for 2011, but Germany won the tournament and France was relegated to Division II for 2011.

Results

Ice hockey
Junior national ice hockey teams